The South Royalton Railroad Station is a former train station in the community of South Royalton, Vermont. The 1886 station building still stands, used as a local bank branch of Bar Harbor Bank & Trust. It is a contributing property to the South Royalton Historic District, on the National Register of Historic Places.

Attributes
The building has a first floor made of brick with horseshoe-shaped colored windows at either end and flared wraparound roofing. Above this is a half-story with overlapping patterned wood shingles, topped with a large slate roof with gables. The gables are decorated with Eastlake bargeboards.

History

The site was first developed in 1849-50, during the construction of the Vermont Central Railroad. Local mill owner Daniel Tarbell decided to construct a freight and passenger depot at the site, instead of at what was then the center of town. The resulting railway village was mostly Greek Revival in style. A fire in 1886 destroyed much of the village, although the old station remained. The village park was expanded, new stores were built, and the new station building was completed, with the former building becoming a freight station.

The building was constructed in 1886, designed by George H. Guernsey, who designed the nearby Debevoise Hall at the Vermont Law School and other town buildings following a large fire that year. The building later became a branch of the Randolph National Bank, which was purchased by Lake Sunapee Bank in 2016. In 2017, Bar Harbor Bank & Trust purchased Sunapee, and so the bank is owned and operated by Bar Harbor.

See also
National Register of Historic Places listings in Windsor County, Vermont

References

External links

 Brank branch website

Buildings and structures in Royalton, Vermont
Former Central Vermont Railway stations
Historic district contributing properties in Vermont
National Register of Historic Places in Windsor County, Vermont
Queen Anne architecture in Vermont
Railway stations on the National Register of Historic Places in Vermont
Transportation buildings and structures in Windsor County, Vermont